Maxixe can refer to
 Maroon cucumber, Portuguese name Maxixe
 Maxixe (dance), a Brazilian dance
 Maxixe, Mozambique, a city in Mozambique
 Maxixe (gemstone), a deep-blue variety of beryl